
Gmina Nałęczów is an urban-rural gmina (administrative district) in Puławy County, Lublin Voivodeship, in eastern Poland.

Villages
Apart from the town of Nałęczów, Gmina Nałęczów contains the villages and settlements of Antopol, Bochotnica-Kolonia, Bronice, Bronice-Kolonia, Chruszczów-Kolonia, Cynków, Czesławice, Drzewce, Drzewce-Kolonia, Ludwinów, Paulinów, Piotrowice, Sadurki and Strzelce.

Neighbouring gminas
Gmina Nałęczów is bordered by the gminas of Garbów, Jastków, Kurów, Markuszów, Wąwolnica and Wojciechów.

References
Polish official population figures 2006

Naleczow
Puławy County